Cononicephora is a genus of Asian bush crickets belonging to the tribe Meconematini within the subfamily Meconematinae. All species are endemic to Vietnam.

Species
, Orthoptera Species File lists two subgenera:
Cononicephora (Acononicephora) Gorochov, 1994
 Cononicephora rentzi Gorochov, 1994 - Tram Lap, Gia Lai Province
Cononicephora (Cononicephora) Gorochov, 1993
 Cononicephora acutilobata Wang, 2020 - Lang Bian mountain
 Cononicephora berezhkovi Gorochov, 1993 - Ba Vi National Park
 Cononicephora tarbinskyi Gorochov, 1993 – type species (from Vĩnh Phúc Province, Vietnam)

References

External links
images of C. rentzi at OSF

Meconematinae
Tettigoniidae genera
Orthoptera of Vietnam
Endemic fauna of Vietnam